Homorthodes fractura is a species of cutworm or dart moth in the family Noctuidae. It is found in North America.

The MONA or Hodges number for Homorthodes fractura is 10534.

Subspecies
These two subspecies belong to the species Homorthodes fractura:
 Homorthodes fractura fractura
 Homorthodes fractura mecrona Smith, 1908

References

Further reading

 
 
 

Eriopygini
Articles created by Qbugbot
Moths described in 1906